A ballpoint pen knife is a multi-tool pocket knife consisting of a blade concealed inside an ordinary-looking ballpoint pen. They first appeared as custom-made pens from various custom knife makers, and were later mass-produced by other companies.

Uses
Pen knives such as these are designed for self-defense due to their ease of concealment. Their small size renders them impractical as weapons in elaborate combat, but their slim profile allows them to cause great harm in close-range combat with an element of surprise. 

A knife of this type can be used as a standard letter or package opener, or for any purpose suitable for a knife of its size. There are many versions, including variants with special purpose razors for shaving.

Kinds of blades
All ballpoint pen knives come with straight blades, which are easier to conceal than curved blades. These  blades are fixed to the topmost part of the pen, hidden inside a hollow cap, serving as both the pen's end and the knife's sheath. Common blades may be the single-edged thrusting type or the double-edged dagger type, or even an unsharpened stiletto type point that can only thrust. Blades can be smooth-edged or serrated. The Swiss Army Spectrum Series  S.A.S.S. Ballpoints look like ballpoint pens and can write. They have an array of foldaway blades and tools including knife, scissors, file, opener, screwdriver and battery-powered light.

Legality
Ballpoint pen knives, because they allow a knife to be disguised as an innocuous object, are subject to restrictions or prohibitions in some jurisdictions. For example, in North America they are not available for sale in California  or Canada.

References

Pocket knives
Blade weapons
Pens